Ahmed Reza Rubel (born 1965) is a Bangladeshi theatre, movie and television actor. He started his career in Selim Al Deen's theatre group "Dhaka Theatre". Later he concentrated into mainstream commercial movies and starred in 6 movies. Then he left the film industry to work in tele-dramas.

Career
Rubel started his career working for "Dhaka Theatre", a theatre group of Selim Al Deen. Then he moved to act in commercial Bengali movies. He starred in the movie Aakhri Hamla and played in a negative role in his subsequent movie. He came back to theatre again to work in Bonopangshul, a theatrical drama. At this point he moved to television dramas by director Aatiqul Huq Chowdhury. But his first appearance in television was Giyasuddin Selim's Swapnojatra. He followed in Humayun Ahmed's Eid drama Poka where he played the character Ghora Mojid. He came to limelight in Ekushey Television serial Pret. Pret was based on Muhammad Zafar Iqbal's novel by the same name and directed by Aahir Alam. He continued working in television with Mostofa Sarwar Faruqui and others.
He also worked in Humayun Ahmed's Bangladesh Liberation War-related movie Shyamol Chhaya. Currently he is busy with his TV schedules.

Filmography
 Ke Oporadhi (1997)
 Meghla Akash (2001)
 Chandrokotha (2003)
 Bachelor (2004)
 Shyamol Chhaya (2004)
 The Last Thakur (2008)
 Guerrilla (2011)
 Jonakir Aalo (2014)
 Parapaar (2014)
 Poush Maser Pirit (2016)
 Alatchakra: Circle of Desire (2021)
 Laal Moroger Jhuti (2021)
 Chiranjeeb Mujib (2021)

Web series 
 Noyon Rahasya-Feluda (2017)
 Bou Diaries (Spotlight) (2021)
 Kaiser (2022)

TV appearances 
 Zindabahar (2022)

Awards

References

External links
 

Living people
Bangladeshi male film actors
Bangladeshi male stage actors
Bangladeshi male television actors
1969 births